Heardred (Proto-Norse *Harðurāðaz), died c. 530, is the son of Hygelac, king of the Geats, and his queen Hygd, in Beowulf. After Hygelac's death, in Frisia, Hygd wants to make Hygelac's nephew Beowulf, king of Geatland, as she fears that the young Heardred won't be able to defend his people. Beowulf, however, declares his trust in the young man and Heardred is proclaimed king.

However, further north in Sweden (then restricted to Svealand), the Swedish king Ohthere dies and is succeeded by his younger brother Onela. Ohthere's sons Eadgils and Eanmund flee to the Geats and are received by Heardred. This makes Onela attack the Geats to neutralize his nephews, and to avenge his father Ongentheow, who had been killed by the Geats. During the battle Heardred is killed. Eanmund is slain by his kinsman Weohstan.

Heardred is succeeded by his cousin Beowulf, who avenges Eanmund by helping Eadgils kill Onela, an event which also appears in Scandinavian sources.

References 

Characters in Beowulf
English heroic legends
Germanic warriors
Kings of the Geats
Mythological kings